Jalan Besar Constituency was a single member constituency within Kallang, Singapore. It existed from 1959 to 1988.

Member of Parliament

Elections

Elections in 1950s

Elections in 1960s

Elections in 1970s

Elections in 1980s

See also
Jalan Besar GRC
Moulmein–Kallang GRC

References

Subdivisions of Singapore
Kallang